Love Synonym Pt.1: Right for Me (stylized as Love Synonym #1: Right for Me) is the first part of the debut extended play by South Korean singer Wonho. It was released by Highline Entertainment and distributed by Kakao M on September 4, 2020.

Background and release 
The EP was announced on August 9, 2020 as Wonho's first solo project, following his departure from Monsta X on October 31, 2019. It contains a total of eight tracks, in both Korean and English.

It was preceded by the English-language single "Losing You", digitally pre-released on August 14, together with an accompanying music video. The lead single "Open Mind" received a simultaneous release alongside the EP on September 4; it was also accompanied by a music video.

Critical reception  
His participation in the writing, arrangement, and composition of many of the songs on the EP garnered praise for his overall musicality, as well as his diversity of style. In addition, the EP's bilingual songs and the participation of several international producers in its creation were noted as contributing to its global appeal.

Commercial performance 
It debuted at number one on the weekly Gaon Album Chart for the period of August 30 – September 5, and at number six on the monthly album chart for September with 143,655 copies sold.

Track listing

Charts

Weekly charts

Monthly chart

Year-end chart

Certification and sales

Awards and nominations

Release history

See also
 List of K-pop albums on the Billboard charts
 List of Gaon Album Chart number ones of 2020

References 

Wonho (singer) EPs
2020 debut EPs
Starship Entertainment EPs
Albums produced by Jon Maguire